Nicola Fibbens (born 29 April 1964) is a British swimmer.

Swimming career
Fibbens competed in four events at the 1984 Summer Olympics.

She represented England and won a gold medal in the 4 x 100 metres freestyle relay, at the 1982 Commonwealth Games in Brisbane, Queensland, Australia. Four years later she represented England and won three medals, a gold medal in the 4 x 100 metres medley relay, a silver medal in the 4 x 100 metres freestyle relay and a bronze medal in the 100 metres freestyle, at the 1986 Commonwealth Games in Edinburgh, Scotland. She is a two times winner of the British Championship in 50 metres freestyle (1984 and 1986).

References

External links
 

1964 births
Living people
British female swimmers
Olympic swimmers of Great Britain
Swimmers at the 1984 Summer Olympics
People from Hertford
Commonwealth Games medallists in swimming
Commonwealth Games gold medallists for England
Commonwealth Games silver medallists for England
Commonwealth Games bronze medallists for England
Swimmers at the 1982 Commonwealth Games
Swimmers at the 1986 Commonwealth Games
20th-century British women
Medallists at the 1982 Commonwealth Games
Medallists at the 1986 Commonwealth Games